Šarūnas is a Lithuanian masculine given name. Šarūnė is the feminine form of this name.

The name allegedly comes from the Old Lithuanian word šarus which means "quick" and its forms šariuoti ("to go rapidly", "to scurry"). This name was popularized by Vincas Krėvė-Mickevičius, who wrote a short story about legendary duke of Merkinė named Šarūnas. The days of this name is February 19 and August 16. As Lithuanian is nearest language idiom to Sanskrit, it is also interpreted "lion" for Hindi word शेर (šeru).

Given name
 Šarūnas Bartas
 Šarūnas Birutis
 Šarūnas Jasikevičius, professional basketball player and coach, 2005 Israeli Basketball Premier League MVP
 Šarūnas Liekis
 Šarūnas Marčiulionis
 Šarūnas Nakas
 Šarūnas Sakalauskas
 Šarūnas Sauka
 Šarūnas Šulskis
 Sharune

Notes

Masculine given names
Feminine given names
Lithuanian masculine given names
Lithuanian feminine given names